This is a list of episodes from the fourteenth season of Shark Tank. The season premiered on September 23, 2022 on ABC. It is the first season to have a live audience.

Episodes

Guest sharks this season include Emma Grede, CEO and co-founder of Good American and founding partner of Skims; Gwyneth Paltrow, actress and founder of goop; Peter Jones, dragon on Dragons' Den; Daniel Lubetzky, founder and executive chairman of Kind; Kendra Scott, founder and CEO of Kendra Scott LLC; and Tony Xu, CEO and co-founder of DoorDash.

References

External links 
 Official website
 

14
2022 American television seasons
2023 American television seasons